The Tainan fake panda incident refers to an incident at a private zoo in Tainan, Taiwan, where a sun bear was painted black and white and falsely presented to visitors as a giant panda.  The bear was first unveiled on 24 December 1987, and quickly drew scepticism as experts were not in power, suspecting fraud.  By 3 January 1988, officials from the Council of Agriculture, and zoology experts from National Taiwan University and Normal University determined the animal was not a true panda.

This incident made popular the use of the term "(giant) cat bear" [(dà)māoxióng, (大)貓熊] instead of "(giant) bear cat" [(dà)xióngmāo, (大)熊貓] to refer to pandas in Taiwan.

References

Fraud
Zoos in Taiwan
1987 in Taiwan
1988 in Taiwan